The Palazzo Mocenigo Casa Vecchia is a palazzo on the Grand Canal in the sestiere of San Marco, Venice, Italy.

Overview 
The palazzo is located between the Rialto Bridge and St Mark's Square. The original Palazzo Mocenigo consisted of four different buildings built for the Mocenigo family, seven of whom were Doges of Venice. Other Palazzi Mocenigo include the Palazzo Mocenigo Casa Nuova and the Palazzo Mocenigo, forming a building complex designed for entertainment.

History 
The palazzo is the first building to the left of the complex on the Grand Canal. Despite the name of "Casa Vecchia" ("Old House"), the palazzo is the newest of the complex. It was rebuilt on the site of an earlier medieval factory building, where the philosopher Giordano Bruno stayed in 1592. It was designed by the architect Francesco Contin and built between 1623 and 1625.

See also 
 Palazzi Mocenigo
 Palazzo Mocenigo Casa Nuova

Sources 
 Italian Wikipedia: :it:Palazzi Mocenigo.

References

External links 

Houses completed in 1625
Mocenigo Casa Vecchia
Mocenigo Casa Vecchia
1625 establishments in Italy